Mysin is a Russian masculine surname, its feminine counterpart is Mysina. It may refer to
Anton Mysin (born 1986), Russian volleyball player
Mikhail Mysin (born 1979), Russian football player
Maksim Mysin (born 1979), Russian football player
Oksana Mysina (born 1961), Russian theatre, film and television actress

Russian-language surnames